The Museo Civico di Storia Naturale Giacomo Doria is a natural history museum in Genoa, northern Italy. It is named after the naturalist Giacomo Doria, who was the founder and the curator for over forty years.

The museum was founded in 1867 and contains over four million specimens from all over the world. It contains zoological, botanical and geological collections. Important collections include those of Luigi D'Albertis, Leonardo Fea, Arturo Issel, Orazio Antinori, Odoardo Beccari and Lamberto Loria. Since 1922 it is the headquarters of the Società entomologica italiana (Italian Entomological Society).

History 
The museum originated from an idea and the support, especially financial, of the founder.

External links

 Official website

Natural history museums in Italy
Museums in Genoa
1867 establishments in Italy
Museums established in 1867